Bear Creek is a stream in the U.S. states of Mississippi and Alabama.  The stream flows approximately  before it empties into the Tennessee River.

Bear Creek is a rather large stream, with a mean annual discharge of approximately 1,126 cubic feet per second at Bishop, the name creek is obviously a misnomer.

Bear Creek's name most likely comes from the Native Americans of the area, who saw many bears near its course.

References

Rivers of Alabama
Rivers of Mississippi
Rivers of Tishomingo County, Mississippi
Rivers of Franklin County, Alabama
Rivers of Lawrence County, Alabama
Rivers of Marion County, Alabama
Rivers of Colbert County, Alabama